This is a list of public art in Indianapolis organized by neighborhoods in the city.

This list applies only to works of public art accessible in an outdoor public space. For example, this does not include artwork  visible inside a museum.

Most of the works mentioned are sculptures. When this is not the case (i.e. sound installation, for example) it is stated next to the title.

Brendonwood

Broad Ripple Village

Butler-Tarkington

Newfields

Castleton

Cold Springs

College Park

Crooked Creek

Crown Hill

Crown Hill Cemetery

Delaware Trail

Downtown

Indiana Statehouse

Indiana University – Purdue University Indianapolis

Other Downtown locations

Eagle Creek

Fairgrounds

Far Eastside

Forest Hills

Fountain Square

Garfield Park

Irvington

Keystone at the Crossing

Mapleton-Fall Creek

Martindale-Brightwood

Meadows

Meridian Hills

Meridian-Kessler

Near Northside

Near Eastside

Near Southside

Near Westside

Nora

North Central

Riverside

St. Vincent-Greenbriar

Bibliography

 Evictions: Art and Spatial Politics by Rosalyn Deutsche. MIT Press, 1998.
 Spirit Poles and Flying Pigs: Public Art and Cultural Democracy in American Communities by Erika Doss. 1995.
 Dialogues in Public Art edited by Tom Finkelpearl. MIT Press, 2000.
 Public Art by the Book edited by Barbara Goldstein. 2005.
 Mapping the Terrain: New Genre Public Art edited by Suzanne Lacy. Bay Press, 1995.
 Art, Space and the City: Public Art and Urban Futures by Malcolm Miles. 1997.
 Art For Public Places: Critical Essays, by Malcolm Miles et al. 1989.
 Monument Wars: Washington, DC, the National Mall, and the Transformation of the Memorial Landscape by Kirk Savage. University of California Press, 2009.
 Critical Issues in Public Art: Content, Context, and Controversy edited by Harriet Senie and Sally Webster. 1993.

See also
 List of public art in Milwaukee
 List of public art in Philadelphia
 List of public art in Washington, D.C.

References

Public art
Indianapolis
Outdoor sculptures in Indianapolis
Indianapolis